
Gmina Kaliska is a rural gmina (administrative district) in Starogard County, Pomeranian Voivodeship, in northern Poland.

Villages
Gmina Kaliska contains the villages and settlements of Bartel Mały, Bartel Wielki, Biedaczek, Cieciorka, Czarne, Dąbrowa, Frank, Iwiczno, Kaliska, Kamienna Karczma, Kazub, Łążek, Leśna Huta, Lipska Karczma, Młyńsk, Okoninki, Piece, Płociczno, Sowi Dół, Strych, Studzienice and Trzechowo.

Neighbouring gminas
Gmina Kaliska is bordered by the gminas of Czersk, Lubichowo, Osieczna, Stara Kiszewa and Zblewo.

References
Polish official population figures 2006

Kaliska
Starogard County